Torment  (also known as Paper Gallows), is a 1950 British thriller film directed by John Guillermin and starring Dermot Walsh, Rona Anderson and John Bentley.

It was the first sole director credit for John Guillermin. He later called the film "a lemon" but it helped launch his career.

Plot
Brothers Cliff and Jim Brandon are a successful writing team specializing in murder mysteries, but Cliff and Jim are almost as disturbed as some of the characters they have created. Whilst researching their latest novel, one of the brothers commits murder, simply to experience the thrill. He then attempts to frame his secretary Joan for the crime. His reason this time is personal: both brothers are in love with Joan, but she prefers one over the other. The saner of the two brothers races against time to save Joan from the gallows and to bring his sibling to justice.

Cast
 Dermot Walsh as Cliff Brandon  
 Rona Anderson as Joan  
 John Bentley as Jim Brandon  
 Michael Martin Harvey as Curley Wilson  
 Valentine Dunn as Mrs. Crier  
 Dilys Laye as Violet Crier

Production
Guillermin had made several films for Adelphi as a producer. One day he saw an elaborate set being torn down and offered Adelphi that he would write a film in three weeks and shoot it in three weeks if he could use the set. They agreed. It did take Guillermin three weeks to write it but six weeks to film.

Guillermin was paid £3,250. According to one writer it was with this film that "Guillermin’s talent for clear, compact, efficient direction became  evident:  his  tautly-shot  thriller  remains  the  strongest  crime  drama in the Adelphi catalogue."

Dermot Walsh says that during filming an electrician fell twenty feet from  railing down to the floor  "but Guillermin wouldn't hold up production he just went on shooting."

Release
It was released in the US in March 1951 as Paper Gallows.

The film was rejected for distribution by the main British cinema circuits but Guillermin found the movie useful in launching his career.

Critical reception
TV Guide wrote, "the story here is nothing new, but the direction is fresh and original. Taking this simplistic plotline, Guillermin manages to inject some good suspense into a modestly budgeted feature. Walsh, Bentley, and Anderson play their roles well and play against one another with skill."

References

External links

Torment at Letterbox DVD

Films directed by John Guillermin
1950 films
British thriller films
1950s thriller films
British black-and-white films
1950s English-language films
1950s British films